Terry Rossio (born July 2, 1960) is an American screenwriter. He co-wrote the films Aladdin, Shrek, and all five of the Pirates of the Caribbean series. He was nominated for the Academy Award for Best Adapted Screenplay for Shrek, and won the Annie Award for Writing in a Feature Production, as well as the BAFTA Award for Best Adapted Screenplay for Shrek. He often collaborates with fellow screenwriter Ted Elliott.

Life and career
Rossio was born in Kalamazoo, Michigan. After graduating from Saddleback High School in Santa Ana, California, he went on to study at California State University, Fullerton where he received his Bachelor of Arts in Communications, with an emphasis in radio, television and film.  He is the founder of Wordplay, also known as Wordplayer.com, one of the premier screenwriting sites on the Internet.

Along with his writing partner Ted Elliott, Rossio has written some of the most successful American films of the past 30 years, including Aladdin, Pirates of the Caribbean: The Curse of the Black Pearl and Shrek. He is the eleventh-most successful screenwriter of all time in terms of domestic box office receipts with totals at around $5.5 billion. In May 1993, Rossio and Elliott were hired by TriStar Pictures to write a screenplay for Godzilla, which featured Godzilla battling a shape-shifting alien in New York. Their script was dropped by Roland Emmerich in favor of a new script of his own co–written with Dean Devlin. However, Rossio and Elliott retained a "Story By" credit.

In 2015, Dodie Gold Management filed a Commissions Non-Payment Lawsuit against Rossio and sought a jury trial for "damages of more than $25,000 plus a court declaration that they are entitled to the 10% commissions and a full look at the records and accounting of Rossio and his Chamaeleon Productions." In March 2017, Legendary Entertainment announced that Rossio would lead their writers room to help develop the story for Godzilla vs. Kong. He received "story by" credit on the film. In June 2019, Rossio was announced as the screenwriter for The Amazing Maurice.

In 2021, Rossio and Bill Marsilii sold their spec script Time Zone to Amazon Studios. The film will be a joint venture between Amazon Studios and Davis Entertainment.

Personal life

Controversy

Rossio created controversy when he argued in support of parents of vaccine-injured children by citing the N-word as a slur not to be emulated with the phrase Anti-Vax. In November 2018, Rossio tweeted: "My heart goes out to all the parents of vaccine damaged children, who have to not only endure the sadness of their loss, but also the vitriol of ill-informed and insensitive people (such as those here). Anti-Vax is equivalent to calling someone a nigger and makes as little sense". Rossio received backlash for using the slur, and for comparing anti-vaccination defenders with victims of racism. Two days later, Rossio apologized for using the slur, stating, "that was a mistake. I am sorry. I now understand that the word has no place in any conversation, ever."

Filmography (partial)

Other credits

References

External links 
 Wordplayer.com
 

1960 births
American male screenwriters
Animation screenwriters
Best Adapted Screenplay BAFTA Award winners
California State University, Fullerton alumni
DreamWorks Animation people
Living people
Writers from Kalamazoo, Michigan
Walt Disney Animation Studios people
People from Santa Ana, California
Screenwriters from California
Screenwriters from Michigan